The Canton of Bain-de-Bretagne is a canton of France, in the Ille-et-Vilaine département, located in the southeast of the department. At the French canton reorganisation which came into effect in March 2015, the canton was expanded from 9 to 20 communes:

Bain-de-Bretagne  
La Bosse-de-Bretagne
Chanteloup
La Couyère
Crevin
La Dominelais
Ercé-en-Lamée
Grand-Fougeray
Lalleu
La Noë-Blanche
Pancé
Le Petit-Fougeray
Pléchâtel
Poligné
Saint-Sulpice-des-Landes
Sainte-Anne-sur-Vilaine
Saulnières
Le Sel-de-Bretagne
Teillay
Tresbœuf

References

Cantons of Ille-et-Vilaine